The Viccourt Cup was a tournament for professional female tennis players played on outdoor hard courts in Donetsk, Ukraine. The event was classified as a $75,000 ITF Women's Circuit tournament which first took place in 2012. The event was cancelled in 2014 due to the pro-Russian unrest in Ukraine.

Past finals

Singles

Doubles

External links 
 Official website 
 ITF search 

 
ITF Women's World Tennis Tour
Hard court tennis tournaments
Tennis tournaments in Ukraine
2012 establishments in Ukraine
Sport in Donetsk
Recurring sporting events established in 2012
Recurring sporting events disestablished in 2013
Defunct sports competitions in Ukraine
2013 disestablishments in Ukraine